This article lists the rulers of Clandeboye (Irish: Clann Aodha Buídhe), a Gaelic túath located in the eastern part of Ulster in the north of Ireland. They are listed from their date of ascension to date of death, unless otherwise stated.

Kings of Clandeboye and Tyrone, 1283—1347

|-
| Brian O'Neill 1283–1295 ||  || Son of Hugh Boy O'Neill and Eleanor de Angulo ||unknown || 1295
|-
| Henry O'Neill 1295–1347 ||  || Son of Brian O'Neill ||unknown || 1347
|-
|}

Kings of Clandeboye, 1347—1555

|-
| Muirchertach Ceannfada O'Neill 1347–1395 ||  || Son of Henry O'Neill ||unknown || 1395
|-
| Brian Ballagh O'Neill 1395–1425 ||  || Son of Muirchertach Ceannfada O'Neill ||unknown || 1425
|-
| Murtagh Roe O'Neill 1425–14411444–1468 ||  || Son of Brian Ballagh O'Neill ||unknown || 1468
|-
| Hugh Boy II O'Neill 1441–1444 ||  || Son of Brian Ballagh O'Neill ||Finola O'Connor (died 1493) ||  2 May 1444
|-
| Conn O'Neill 1468–1482 ||  || Son of Hugh Boy II O'Neill and Finola O'Connor||Mary MacDonald ||  1482
|-
| Niall Mór O'Neill 1482–1512 ||  || Son of Conn O'Neill and Mary MacDonald||Inion Dubh O'Donnell ||  1512
|-
| Hugh Dubh O'Neill 1512–1524 ||  || Son of Niall Mór O'Neill and Inion Dubh O'Donnell||unknown||  1524
|-
| Brian Ballagh II O'Neill 1524–1529 ||  || Son of Niall Mór O'Neill and Inion Dubh O'Donnell 	||unknown||  1529
|-
| Phelim Bacagh O'Neill 1529–1533 ||  || Son of Niall Mór O'Neill and Inion Dubh O'Donnell 	||unknown||  1533
|-
| Niall Oge O'Neill 1533–1537 ||  || Son of Niall Mór O'Neill and Inion Dubh O'Donnell 	||unknown||  1537
|-
| Murtagh Dulenach O'Neill 1537– ||  || Son of Niall Mór O'Neill and Inion Dubh O'Donnell 	||unknown||  after 1556
|-
|}
Murtagh Dulenaach O'Neill was the last to claim overlordship of all Clandeboye. During his reign the sons of Phelim Bacagh and Niall Oge founded their own lordships at Murtagh's expense, reducing him to lord in name only. The Annals of the Four Masters regarded Hugh, son of Niall Oge, as lord of Clandeboye until his death in 1555.

Lords of Lower Clandeboye, 1556—1600
The lordship of Lower Clandeboye (also known as Northern Clandeboye) was founded by the sons of Phelim Bacagh O'Neill. This covered the north of what is today County Down.

|-
| Sir Brian McPhelim O'Neill 1556–1575 ||  || Son of Phelim Bacagh O'Neill ||unknown || 20 January 1575
|-
|}

Lord of Lower Clandeboye (Belfast)

|-
| Shane McBrian O'Neill 1584–1616 ||  || Son of Sir Brian McPhelim O'Neill ||unknown || 1616
|-
|}

Lords of Lower Clandeboye (Edenduffcarrick)

|-
| Hugh Oge McHugh O'Neill 1584–1586 ||  || Son of Hugh O'Neill son of Phelim Bacagh O'Neill ||unknown || 1586
|-
| Neill McHugh O'Neill 1586–1600 ||  || Son of Hugh O'Neill son of Phelim Bacagh O'Neill ||unknown || 1600
|-
|}

Lords of Upper Clandeboye, —1619
The lordship of Upper Clandeboye (also known as Southern Clandeboye) was founded by the sons of Niall Oge O'Neill. This covered the south of what is today County Antrim.

|-
| Brian Faghartach O'Neill –1548 ||  || Son of Niall Oge O'Neill ||unknown || 1548
|-
| Niall McBrian Fertagh O'Neill 1548–1584 ||  || Son of Brian Faghartach O'Neill ||unknown || 1601
|-
| Conn McNeill O'Neill 1584–1619 ||  || Son of Niall McBrian Fertagh O'Neill ||unknown || 1619
|-
|}

See also
 List of High Kings of Ireland
 List of kings of Tyrone
 List of kings of Tyrconnell
 List of kings of Ailech
 List of kings of Airgíalla
 List of kings of Dál nAraidi
 List of kings of Ulster
 List of kings of Dál Riata

References

Clandeboye
Clandeboye
O'Neill dynasty